Best So Far is a greatest hits album by Australian tenor, Mark Vincent. The album was released through Sony Music Australia on 25 April 2014 and peaked at number 15 on the ARIA Charts.

Background and release
Mark Vincent was 15 years old when he first came onto the scene singing "Nessun Dorma" on the program Australia's Got Talent in 2009. He was declared the winner in April and has released five studio albums between 2009 and 2013; all of which have charted within the top 20 on the Australian ARIA Chart. To celebrate his upcoming 21st birthday, Sony Music Australia released his first 'best of' compilation titled Best So Far.

Track listing
 "Nessun Dorma" - 3:13
 "Hallelujah" - 3:23
 "You Raise Me Up" - 4:04
 "This is the Moment" - 3:18
 "Music of the Night" - 5:30
 "Nella Fantasia" - 4:35
 "Funiculi Funicula" - 2:50
 "O Sole Mio" - 3:25
 "The Impossible Dream" - 5:06
 "Young at Heart" - 2:48
 "Non Ti Scordar Di Me" - 3:07
 "Time to Say Goodbye" - 4:08
 "Besame Mucho" - 3:53
 "Ave Maria" - 4:39
 "Crying" - 3:58
 "Look Inside" - 3:38

Weekly charts

Release history

References

2014 greatest hits albums
Mark Vincent albums
Compilation albums by Australian artists
Sony Music Australia albums